Fencing is one of the sports at the quadrennial Mediterranean Games competition. It has been one of the sports competed at the event since the inaugural edition in 1951.

Summary

Events

Men's

Women's

All-time medal table

Updated after the 2022 Mediterranean Games. Italics represent teams that no longer exist.

See also
Fencing at the Summer Olympics

References

 
M
F
Mediterranean Games
Mediterranean Games
Mediterranean games
Mediterranean Games